The 7th congressional district of Tennessee is a congressional district located in parts of Middle and West Tennessee. It has been represented by Republican Mark E. Green since January 2019.

Current boundaries
The district is located in both West and Middle Tennessee. It stretches as far north as the Kentucky border, as far south as the Alabama border, as far east as Franklin, and as far west as Camden.

It is currently composed of the following counties: Cheatham, Dickson, Decatur, Hickman, Houston, Humphreys, Montgomery, Perry, Robertson, Stewart, and Wayne. It also includes significant portions of Benton, Davidson, and Williamson.

Characteristics
The seventh district has significant suburban and rural areas. Although most of the area is rural, more than half of the district's vote is cast in either Montgomery County (Clarksville) or Williamson County (Franklin, Brentwood).

By most measures, Williamson County is the wealthiest county in the state and is usually ranked near the top nationally.

The district has a very strong military presence, as it includes Tennessee's share of Fort Campbell.

Politically speaking, the area was secessionist and part of the Democrats' “Solid South” for a century after the Civil War, excluding heavily Republican Unionist Highland Rim Wayne County. However, since being carried by George Wallace in 1968 it has become and remained one of the most Republican areas in Tennessee, and has not been represented by a Democrat since the early 1970s. The presence of Nashville's suburbs gives it a character similar to those of most affluent suburban districts in much of the South until the mid-2000s. It has a strong social conservative bent; many of the state's most politically active churches are either located here or draw most of their congregations from here.

The rural secessionist counties are similar demographically to the 8th district and returned to the Democrats until the 2000s; three of the five Tennessee counties won by George McGovern lie within this district. However, since the mid-2000s these counties have turned overwhelmingly Republican in all elections. The only area where Democrats currently compete on anything resembling an even basis is in Clarksville, which still occasionally elects Democrats to the state legislature.

Election results from presidential races 
Results Under Old Lines (2013-2023)

History
Districts stretching from Clarksville to West Tennessee have existed in one form or another since 1871. For most of the time from 1933 to 1983 (except for 1943 to 1953), it was numbered as the 6th district.

This district assumed something approaching its current configuration in 1973, when Tennessee lost a congressional district. At that time, the 6th was redrawn to stretch from Williamson County, south of Nashville, to the eastern suburbs of Memphis and covering the rural areas in between. Republican Robin Beard represented this area from 1973 to 1983.

Tennessee gained a congressional district following the 1980 census. At this time, the district was re-numbered as the 7th and lost its eastern counties to the  4th and 6th districts. At the same time, most of its black residents closer to Memphis were drawn into the 9th district. Following this re-districting, Beard made an unsuccessful U.S. Senate bid, and was replaced by former Shelby County Republican Party chair Don Sundquist.

Sundquist served through the rest of the 1980s through the 1990 re-districting, which saw the district lose some of its rural counties while picking up Maury County.

In 1994, Sundquist successfully ran for Governor of Tennessee, defeating future governor Phil Bredesen. Sundquist was then replaced by Ed Bryant.

Bryant served from 1995 until 2002, when the district was gerrymandered by the Democrat-led Tennessee General Assembly to pack the consistently Republican suburbs of Nashville and Memphis into one district.

Following that re-districting, the area chose Brentwood-based state senator Marsha Blackburn. She served from 2003 to 2019.

Redistricting after the 2010 census made the district somewhat more compact, restoring a configuration similar to the 1983-2003 lines. However, it lost its share of the Memphis suburbs to the 8th, a move which made the 8th as heavily Republican as the 7th.

In 2018, Blackburn successfully ran for US Senate, defeating former governor Phil Bredesen. In the concurrent election, the district selected doctor and former state senator Mark E. Green.

List of members representing the district

Historical district boundaries

See also

Tennessee's congressional districts
List of United States congressional districts

References

 Congressional Biographical Directory of the United States 1774–present

07
1823 establishments in Tennessee